Leon Howard (born 1955) is an American politician. He is a member of the South Carolina House of Representatives from the 76th District, serving since 1995. He is a member of the Democratic party.

Howard currently serves as Chair of the Richland County Legislative Delegation and serves on the House Ways and Means Committee.

References

External links 

Living people
Democratic Party members of the South Carolina House of Representatives
1955 births
African-American state legislators in South Carolina
21st-century American politicians
21st-century African-American politicians
20th-century African-American people